Massachusetts House of Representatives' 30th Middlesex district in the United States is one of 160 legislative districts included in the lower house of the Massachusetts General Court. It covers parts of Reading and Woburn in Middlesex County. Since 2019, Richard M. Haggerty of the Democratic Party has represented the district.

The current district geographic boundary overlaps with those of the Massachusetts Senate's 4th Middlesex and 5th Middlesex districts.

Representatives

 Carol A. Donovan, 2003-2005 
 Patrick Natale
 James J. Dwyer
 Richard M. Haggerty, 2019-current

See also
 List of Massachusetts House of Representatives elections
 List of Massachusetts General Courts
 List of former districts of the Massachusetts House of Representatives

Images
Portraits of legislators

References

External links
 Ballotpedia
  (State House district information based on U.S. Census Bureau's American Community Survey).

House
Government of Middlesex County, Massachusetts